David G. Kelley (born October 11, 1928) is an American former politician in the state of California. A Republican, he served in the California State Assembly and California State Senate between the years of 1978 and 2002. He was born in Riverside, California.

References

Living people
Republican Party members of the California State Assembly
People from Riverside, California
1928 births
Republican Party California state senators
20th-century American politicians
United States Air Force personnel of the Korean War